The 1956 Wyoming Cowboys baseball team represented the University of Wyoming in the 1956 NCAA baseball season. The Cowboys played their home games at Cowboy Field. The team was coached by Bud Daniel in his 6th year as head coach at Wyoming.

The Cowboys won the District VII to advance to the College World Series, where they were defeated by the Bradley Braves.

Roster

Schedule

! style="" | Regular Season
|- valign="top" 

|- bgcolor="#ccffcc"
| 1 || April 3 || at Kirtland Air Force Base || Unknown • Albuquerque, New Mexico || 2–1 || 1–0 || –
|- bgcolor="#ccffcc"
| 2 || April 4 || at  || Lobo Field • Albuquerque, New Mexico || 6–3 || 2–0 || 1–0
|- bgcolor="#ccffcc"
| 3 || April 4 || at New Mexico || Lobo Field • Albuquerque, New Mexico || 10–5 || 3–0 || 2–0
|- align="center" bgcolor=
| 4 || April 5 || at  || Unknown • Tempe, Arizona || – || – || 2–0
|- align="center" bgcolor=
| 5 || April 5 || at Arizona State || Unknown • Tempe, Arizona || – || – || 2–0
|- align="center" bgcolor=
| 6 || April 5 || at Arizona State || Unknown • Tempe, Arizona || – || – || 2–0
|- bgcolor="#ffcccc"
| 7 || April 9 || at Arizona || UA Field • Tucson, Arizona || 5–10 || 4–3 || 2–0
|- bgcolor="#ffcccc"
| 8 || April 10 || at Arizona || UA Field • Tucson, Arizona || 4–15 || 4–4 || 2–0
|- bgcolor="#ffcccc"
| 9 || April 11 || at Arizona || UA Field • Tucson, Arizona || 2–17 || 4–5 || 2–0
|- align="center" bgcolor=
| 10 || April 14 || at  || Unknown • Denver, Colorado || – || – || –
|- align="center" bgcolor=
| 11 || April 15 || at Denver || Unknown • Denver, Colorado || – || – || 3–1
|- bgcolor="#ffcccc"
| 12 || April 16 ||  || Unknown • Unknown || – || 5–7 || 3–1
|- bgcolor="#ffcccc"
| 13 || April 17 || Colorado || Unknown • Unknown || 2–12 || 5–8 || 3–1
|- bgcolor="#ffcccc"
| 14 || April 20 || at  || Jackson Field • Greeley, Colorado || 5–6 || 5–9 || 3–1
|- bgcolor="#ccffcc"
| 15 || April 21 || Colorado State || Cowboy Field • Laramie, Wyoming || 5–3 || 6–9 || 3–1
|- bgcolor="#ffcccc"
| 16 || April 21 || Colorado || Cowboy Field • Laramie, Wyoming || 10–17 || 6–10 || 3–1
|- bgcolor="#ccffcc"
| 17 || April 27 || at  || Unknown • Fort Collins, Colorado || 13–2 || 7–10 || 4–1
|- bgcolor="#ccffcc"
| 18 || April 27 || at Francis E. Warren Air Force Base || Unknown • Cheyenne, Wyoming || 9–3 || 8–10 || 4–1
|-

|- bgcolor="#ccffcc"
| 19 || May 1 || Francis E. Warren Air Force Base || Cowboy Field • Laramie, Wyoming || 12–8 || 9–10 || 4–1
|- bgcolor="#ccffcc"
| 20 || May 4 || Denver || Cowboy Field • Laramie, Wyoming || 15–6 || 10–10 || 5–1
|- bgcolor="#ccffcc"
| 21 || May 5 || Denver || Cowboy Field • Laramie, Wyoming || 8–5 || 11–10 || 6–1
|- bgcolor="#ccffcc"
| 22 || May 8 || Lowry Air Force Base || Cowboy Field • Laramie, Wyoming || 10–2 || 12–10 || 6–1
|- bgcolor="#ffcccc"
| 23 || May 11 || New Mexico || Cowboy Field • Laramie, Wyoming || 5–8 || 12–11 || 6–2
|- bgcolor="#ccffcc"
| 24 || May 12 || New Mexico || Cowboy Field • Laramie, Wyoming || 16–9 || 13–11 || 7–2
|-

|-
! style="" | Postseason
|- valign="top" 

|- bgcolor="#ccffcc"
| 25 || May 25 || at  || Derks Field • Salt Lake City, Utah || 8–5 || 14–11 || 7–2
|- bgcolor="#ffcccc"
| 26 || May 26 || at Utah || Derks Field • Salt Lake City, Utah || 3–8 || 14–12 || 7–2
|- bgcolor="#ccffcc"
| 27 || May 26 || at Utah || Derks Field • Salt Lake City, Utah || 9–7 || 15–12 || 7–2
|-

|- bgcolor="#ccffcc"
| 28 || June 1 || vs Colorado State || Jackson Field • Greeley, Colorado || 8–5 || 16–12 || 7–2
|- bgcolor="#ffcccc"
| 29 || June 1 || vs Colorado State || Jackson Field • Greeley, Colorado|| 3–8 || 16–13 || 7–2
|- bgcolor="#ccffcc"
| 30 || June 2 || vs Colorado State || Jackson Field • Greeley, Colorado|| 9–7 || 17–13 || 7–2
|-

|- bgcolor="#ffcccc"
| 31 || June 9 || vs Minnesota || Omaha Municipal Stadium • Omaha, Nebraska || 0–4 || 17–14 || 7–2
|- bgcolor="#ccffcc"
| 32 || June 10 || vs NYU || Omaha Municipal Stadium • Omaha, Nebraska || 8–2 || 18–14 || 7–2
|- bgcolor="#ffcccc"
| 33 || June 11 || vs Bradley || Omaha Municipal Stadium • Omaha, Nebraska || 12–8 || 18–15 || 7–2
|-

References

Wyoming Cowboys baseball seasons
Wyoming Cowboys baseball
College World Series seasons
Wyoming
Skyline Conference (1938–1962) baseball champion seasons